Verticordia huegelii, commonly known as variegated featherflower, is a flowering plant in the myrtle family, Myrtaceae and is endemic to the south-west of Western Australia. It is a sometimes an erect shrub, sometimes sprawling to almost prostrate. It has linear leaves and very feathery flowers in spring. The flowers are usually cream-coloured or white, becoming pinkish and reddish or maroon as the flowers age, giving a variegated appearance to the display.

Description

Flowering time is mostly from September to November, but varies to a degree depending on the variety.

Taxonomy and naming
Verticordia huegelii was first formally described by Stephan Endlicher in 1837 and the description was published in Enumeratio plantarum quas in Novae Hollandiae ora austro-occidentali ad fluvium Cygnorum et in sinu Regis Georgii collegit Carolus Liber Baro de Hügel from specimens collected by Charles von Hügel near the Swan River in 1833. The specific epithet (huegelii) commemorates Hugel, the collector of the type specimen.

In his 1991 revision of the genus Verticordia, Alex George recognised four varieties:
 Verticordia huegelii Endl.  var. huegelii which is an upright shrub with flowers that are cream, pale yellow or white when they open and have narrow egg-shaped, finely fringed staminodes;
 Verticordia huegelii var. decumbens  A.S.George  which is an almost prostrate shrub but otherwise similar to var. huegelii;
 Verticordia huegelii var. stylosa (Turcz.) A.S.George which is similar to var. huegelii but has flowers which are greenish-yellow when they first open;
 Verticordia huegelii var. tridens  A.S.George  which has linear to gradually tapering staminodes, in contrast with those of the other varieties.

In the same review, George placed this species in subgenus Verticordia, section Pilocosta along with V. brachypoda and V. multiflora.

Distribution and habitat
This verticordia grows in sand and clay, often with granite, laterite or sandstone and usually in association with other verticordia species. Distribution depends on subspecies but in general it occurs from Geraldton south to the Porongurup National Park and inland as far as Wongan Hills in the Avon Wheatbelt, Geraldton Sandplains, Jarrah Forest, Swan Coastal Plain, Esperance Plains and Mallee biogeographic regions.

Conservation
Verticordia huegelii var. tridens is classified as "Priority Three" meaning that it is poorly known and known from only a few locations but is not under imminent threat. The other three varieties are classified as "not threatened".

References

huegelii
Endemic flora of Western Australia
Myrtales of Australia
Rosids of Western Australia
Plants described in 1837
Taxa named by Stephan Endlicher